Adam Harry Webster (born 4 January 1995) is an English professional footballer who plays as a centre back for  club Brighton & Hove Albion. Webster is a product of Portsmouth's youth academy and made his first-team debut for the club in 2012.

Early life
Webster was born in Chichester, West Sussex and was raised in nearby West Wittering.

Club career

Portsmouth
Webster joined Portsmouth at the age of 12, following rejections from Southampton, Chelsea and even Portsmouth from the age of ten. He signed academy scholarship with the club in the summer of 2011.

Under the management of Michael Appleton, Webster was given more first-team opportunities. Following an unused substitute appearance against Chelsea in the FA Cup, he made his debut at the age of 17 the following weekend in a Football League Championship match against West Ham United. He came on at right back in place of Greg Halford on the 75th minute.

In the following season, Webster received the #22 jersey, and had more opportunities in first team, making his breakthrough as a full back. When recalled from Aldershot Town, he was put into the starting line up against Hartlepool United. Webster scored the only goal of the game, and his first senior goal, handing Portsmouth a 1–0 victory.

Aldershot Town (loan)
On 6 August 2013, Webster joined Aldershot Town on loan, until January 2014. He made his Shots debut four days later, in a 1–1 away draw against Grimsby. He returned to "Pompey" on 4 January, after making 21 appearances, and on the 21st he rejoined the "Shots" on loan until the end of the season.

Ipswich Town

On 6 June 2016, Webster moved to EFL Championship club Ipswich Town from Portsmouth for an undisclosed fee, in a deal which also saw defender Matt Clarke go in the opposite direction. He made his debut for the club on 6 August, starting in a 4–2 home win over Barnsley at Portman Road. He scored his first goal for Ipswich against Birmingham City on 13 December 2016. Webster made 24 appearances in all competitions during the 2016–17 season, scoring once.

Webster made his first appearance of the 2017–18 season on the opening day of the season in a 1–0 win over Birmingham City. He formed a defensive partnership with club captain Luke Chambers over the course of the season, making made 29 appearances in all competitions during his second season at the club.

Bristol City
On 28 June 2018, Webster transferred to fellow Football League Championship club Bristol City for an initial fee of £3.5 million rising up to £8 million.

Brighton & Hove Albion
On 3 August 2019, Brighton completed the signing of Webster, signing him on a four-year deal for an undisclosed fee. He made his debut 25 days later on the 27 August in a 2–1 away win against Bristol Rovers in the EFL Cup. Webster made his Premier League debut and league debut for The Seagulls starting in the 4–0 away loss to defending champions Manchester City on 31 August. Webster scored his first goal for Brighton and his first in the top flight on 19 October in a 2–1 defeat to Aston Villa at Villa Park. Throughout Webster's debut season for Brighton he kept his competition in Shane Duffy out of the starting line-up on a regular basis, starting in all 31 league appearances he played in, scoring three goals, assisting one and recording five clean sheets.

Webster played in Brighton's 1–0 away victory over defending champions Liverpool on 3 February, claiming their first league win at Anfield since 1982. He scored his first goal of the season, scoring the equaliser – coming from 2–0 down – in an eventual 3–2 home victory over champions Manchester City on 18 May, with fans returning to football.

Webster signed a new five-year contract with Brighton on 2 August 2021, extending his tenure at the club until 2026. He went off with a hamstring injury in an eventual 1–0 away win over Brentford on 11 September, which ruled out for four matches. He scored his first goal of the season on his return on 27 October, with Brighton's first equaliser in an eventual penalty shoot-out loss away at Leicester City in the fourth round of the EFL Cup. He made his return to Premier League action on 6 November, coming on as a 75th-minute substitute for Tariq Lamptey in the 1–1 home draw against Newcastle. After making a few appearances since his return to fitness Webster suffered a further injury blow as he was forced off with a calf injury in the first half of a 1–1 away draw at West Ham on 1 December. It was revealed that he would be out until Brentford's visit to Falmer Stadium on 26 December at the earliest. Webster did make his return in this match, playing the whole match helping Brighton end their 12-game winless run by beating Brentford 2–0. Webster scored his second goal of the season – and first league goal, a header from an Alexis Mac Allister corner scoring the equaliser in the 1–1 home draw against European champions Chelsea on 18 January 2022, in which he captained the side in Lewis Dunk's absence. Webster suffered a further injury with his groin in mid February and spent almost two months out injured making his return as a substitute in a 2–1 away win over Arsenal on 9 April, ending Brighton's seven match winless streak. On 7 May, Webster came on as a substitute to see off Brighton's biggest ever top flight victory, a 4–0 win over Manchester United.

On 1 October, after Robert Sánchez missed timed a cross into the box the ball bounced off Webster into Brighton's net, before Leandro Trossard scored the decisive equaliser in the eventual 3–3 away draw at Liverpool. On 19 March 2023, Webster assisted Solly March's powerful header who made a diagonal run into the box as Brighton went on to reach the FA Cup semi-final after winning 5–0 at home to League Two side Grimsby Town.

International career
The same week he made his debut for Portsmouth, Webster was called up to the England U17's for a friendly tournament in Portugal.

In October 2012, Webster was called up to the England U19, but his manager Michael Appleton blocked the requests from FA due to player shortage in Portsmouth. Later in the month, he was called up to England U18's.

On 24 October 2012, Webster made his national team debut at under-18 level in a 2–0 win against Italy.

On 13 November 2012, Webster made his England Under 19's debut in a 1–0 win over Finland, coming as a second-half substitute for Jack Stephens.
On 24 May 2013, Webster made his third appearance for the U19's coming on as a substitute in a match against Georgia.

Career statistics

Honours
Individual
Bristol City Player of the Year: 2018–19

References

External links

1995 births
Living people
Sportspeople from Chichester
Footballers from West Sussex
English footballers
Association football defenders
Portsmouth F.C. players
Aldershot Town F.C. players
Ipswich Town F.C. players
Bristol City F.C. players
Brighton & Hove Albion F.C. players
English Football League players
National League (English football) players
Premier League players
England youth international footballers